Alain Bernard (born 1 May 1983) is a former French swimmer from Aubagne, Bouches-du-Rhône.

Bernard won a total of four medals (two golds, one silver, and one bronze) at two Olympic Games (2008 and 2012). He also won numerous medals at the World Championships (short course and long course) and European Championships (short course and long course). Bernard formerly held the world record for the 50 metres freestyle (long course) and the 100 metres freestyle (long course and short course).

Bernard has a shark tattoo on his right hip.

2008 European (Long Course) Championships 
Bernard won the European (Long Course) Championships 2008 100 m freestyle final in a new world record time of 47.50 seconds on 22 March 2008. He had already beaten the world record the previous day, finishing in 47.60 seconds in the semi-finals. On 23 March 2008 Bernard broke Eamon Sullivan's 50 m freestyle world record in the semi-finals of the same championships, setting a new world record of 21.50 seconds. Bernard would go on to win the 50m freestyle final in 21.66 seconds. But Bernard's 21.50-second world record only stood for four days; it was reclaimed by Eamon Sullivan.

2008 Olympics 
At the French national championships, Bernard qualified for the Olympic Games in Beijing in the 50 m freestyle (with a time of 21.69 s) and 100 m freestyle (47.82 s).

Before the 4×100 m freestyle relay, Bernard taunted the American swim team. Bernard claimed to a newspaper that he and his French teammates, favorite to win the relay, "were going to smash the American team. That's what we came here for". But the French team ended up in second place behind the American team by .08 seconds. Bernard, who had a lead going into the final leg of slightly less than a body length, was caught in the final strokes by Jason Lezak, whose final leg of 46.06 seconds was the fastest relay leg in history.

The close defeat left Bernard "wounded," according to his coach. However, he rebounded to win the men's 100 metres freestyle gold medal. Bernard had one day earlier set a new 100 metres freestyle long course world record of 47.20 s in the semi-finals. Bernard became only the second Frenchman to win an Olympic gold medal in swimming, after Jean Boiteux, who won the 400 m freestyle at the 1952 Helsinki Games. He also finished third in the men's 50 metres freestyle final behind César Cielo Filho of Brazil and Amaury Leveaux of France, making it the first time in Olympic history that France had produced two medallists in a swimming final.

2012 Olympics 
Bernard failed to qualify for the 50 m freestyle and 100 m freestyle events of the 2012 Summer Olympics in London by finishing only fifth in both events during the French swimming championships in March 2012. He was in the French 4 × 100 m freestyle relay team in the heats at the Olympics, but was not included in the team for the final. France won the event which made Bernard a two-time Olympic gold medalist.

He announced his retirement from swimming shortly after the 2012 Olympic Games.

Awards 
Bernard was chosen as the 2008 L'Équipe Champion of Champions(France category) by L'Équipe.

He was also chosen as the 2008 RTL Champion of Champions by RTL, a French commercial radio network. This annual sports award was inaugurated in 2008.

On 1 January 2013, Bernard was made an Officer (Officier) of the French National Order of Merit.

Personal bests 

The 100m long course time (46.94) was not admissible as a world record because it was swum in a non-approved swimsuit.

Service in the French Gendarmerie 

Alain Bernard has been a volunteer in the Gendarmerie since 2008 and was until recently attached to the Groupement blindé de gendarmerie mobile based in Versailles-Satory in the Yvelines department.

See also 
 World record progression 50 metres freestyle
 World record progression 100 metres freestyle

References

External links

  
 
 
 
 
 Fiche de Bernard, website of the sports daily L'Équipe 
 "Alain Bernard", n°29 on Time's list of "100 Olympic Athletes To Watch"

1983 births
World record setters in swimming
French male freestyle swimmers
Medalists at the FINA World Swimming Championships (25 m)
Living people
Officers of the Ordre national du Mérite
Olympic swimmers of France
Olympic gold medalists for France
Olympic silver medalists for France
Olympic bronze medalists for France
Olympic bronze medalists in swimming
People from Aubagne
Swimmers at the 2008 Summer Olympics
Swimmers at the 2012 Summer Olympics
World Aquatics Championships medalists in swimming
European Aquatics Championships medalists in swimming
Medalists at the 2012 Summer Olympics
Medalists at the 2008 Summer Olympics
European champions for France
Olympic gold medalists in swimming
Olympic silver medalists in swimming
Mediterranean Games gold medalists for France
Swimmers at the 2005 Mediterranean Games
Swimmers at the 2009 Mediterranean Games
Universiade medalists in swimming
Sportspeople from Bouches-du-Rhône
Mediterranean Games medalists in swimming
Universiade gold medalists for France
Medalists at the 2005 Summer Universiade